Ian Mussington (born May 30, 1967) is a musician, session drummer and percussionist.

He was the former drummer for the Minneapolis band Soul Asylum from 1998–2001. He joined the band shortly after Sterling Campbell departed. Mussington toured with the band until he left in the early 2000's to move to Australia.  He also worked on Dave Pirner's 2002 solo album, Faces & Names and was a member of the short-lived 1990s band Stress.

He previous has been a member of or done session work for Wyclef Jean, Lenny Kravitz, Misty Oldland, 12 Rounds and others.

References

American rock drummers
1969 births
Living people
20th-century American drummers
American male drummers
Soul Asylum members
20th-century American male musicians